Emil Boc (born 6 September 1966) is a Romanian politician who was Prime Minister of Romania from 22 December 2008 until 6 February 2012 and is the current Mayor of Cluj-Napoca, the largest city of Transylvania, where he was first elected in July 2004. Boc was also the president of the Democratic Liberal Party (PDL), which proposed and supported him as Prime Minister in late 2008, from December 2004 until July 2012.

On 13 October 2009, his cabinet fell after losing a motion of no confidence in Parliament. He was acting as the head of acting cabinet until a new Prime Minister and cabinet were confirmed by Parliament. On 17 December 2009, President Traian Băsescu designated him again to form a new government, receiving afterwards the vote of confidence from the Parliament.

Personal life 

Emil was born to Ioan and Ana Boc in the village of Răchițele, commune Mărgău, Cluj County; he has three older brothers (Ioan, Gheorghe, and Traian) and one sister (Dorina). Emil Boc and his wife Oana, a university lecturer whom he married in July 1994, have two daughters, Cezara and Patricia. He and his family belong to the Romanian Orthodox Church.

Political career 
Boc's entrance into mainstream Romanian politics was in 2003, when he was elected executive president of the Democratic Party (PD); he had been proposed by Traian Băsescu. His original job was to clearly define the Democratic Party's identity so that it would not be confused with the National Liberal Party (PNL).

Mayor of Cluj-Napoca 
He assumed the position of mayor after the 2004 election victory against the far right nationalist Gheorghe Funar of Romanian National Unity Party (PUNR), who had previously been mayor of Cluj-Napoca for twelve years. In that election, Funar lost out in the first round to both Boc and the Social Democratic Party (PSD) candidate Ioan Rus. Boc went on to defeat Rus in a run-off election. In the 2008 election, Boc received 76.2% of the vote, avoiding a second round.  In May 2012 Emil Boc announced to run again for mayor of Cluj-Napoca in the June 2012 local elections which he won.

Prime Minister of Romania 
Following the 2008 legislative elections, the Democratic Liberal Party (PDL) and the Social Democratic Party (PSD) joined forces to form a government. President Traian Băsescu initially nominated Theodor Stolojan as Prime Minister, but, following Stolojan's withdrawal, on 15 December Boc was nominated as head of government and was confirmed by Parliament on 22 December 2008.

Boc's government fell after a vote of no confidence in the Parliament on 13 October 2009. The vote followed the collapse of his ruling coalition, which was caused by his ousting of Dan Nica, the interior minister. Boc acted as interim Prime Minister until a new government was to take charge. The opposition parliamentary groups proposed Klaus Iohannis as a candidate, but President Traian Băsescu nominated Lucian Croitoru, and after his failing to obtain the Parliament confirmation for his government, he nominated Liviu Negoiță. Eventually, Boc was reinstated as Prime Minister after the presidential elections ended with the victory of incumbent president Traian Băsescu who supported him.

On 6 February 2012, Boc resigned from office amid ongoing protests.

Electoral history

Mayor of Cluj-Napoca

References

External links

 Official site

1966 births
Living people
People from Cluj County
Members of the Romanian Orthodox Church
Eastern Orthodox Christians from Romania
Democratic Party (Romania) politicians
Democratic Liberal Party (Romania) politicians
Prime Ministers of Romania
Members of the Chamber of Deputies (Romania)
Mayors of Cluj-Napoca